Alvorada d'Oeste is a municipality located in the Brazilian state of Rondônia. Its population was 14,106 (2020) and its area is 3,029 km².

References

Municipalities in Rondônia